The 2023 Atlantic Coast Conference football season, part of the 2023 NCAA Division I FBS football season, is the 71st season of college football play for the Atlantic Coast Conference (ACC). The ACC consists of 14 members. The 2023 season will be first season without divisions since 2005. The entire schedule was released on January 30, 2023.

Previous season

Clemson defeated North Carolina 39−10 in the 2022 ACC Championship Game at Bank of America Stadium in Charlotte, North Carolina.

Coaches

Coaching changes
The ACC entered the 2023 season with two new head football coaches:

 On September 25, 2022, Georgia Tech fired head coach Geoff Collins and was replaced by interim head coach Brent Key. On November 29, 2022 Key was hired as the next head coach.
 On December 5, 2022, Cincinnati hired Louisville head coach Scott Satterfield and was replaced by Jeff Brohm on December 7, 2023.

Head coaching records

Rankings

Schedule
The Regular season will begin on Thursday August 31, 2023, and will end on Saturday November 25, 2023. The ACC Championship Game will be played on Saturday December 2, 2023, at Bank of America Stadium in Charlotte, North Carolina.

Regular season

Week one

Week two

Week three

Week four

Week five

Week six

Week seven

Week eight

Week nine

Week ten

Week eleven

Week twelve

Week thirteen

Championship Game

ACC vs other conferences

ACC vs Power Five matchups
The following games include ACC teams competing against Power Five conferences teams from the Big Ten, Big 12, Pac-12, SEC and against Notre Dame. All rankings are from the AP Poll at the time of the game.

ACC vs Group of Five matchups
The following games include ACC teams competing against teams from the American, C-USA, MAC, Mountain West or Sun Belt.

ACC vs FBS independents matchups
The following games include ACC teams competing against FBS Independents, which includes Army, UConn or UMass.

ACC vs FCS matchups
The Football Championship Subdivision comprises 13 conferences and two independent programs.

Records against other conferences

Regular Season

Post Season

Postseason
The bowl games will begin on December 16, 2023 and will end with the College Football Playoff National Championship on January 8, 2024.

Bowl games

Home game attendance

Bold – Exceeded capacity
†Season High

References